Jack Stephens may refer to:

Jack Stephens (American football) (born 1939), American former football coach
Jack Stephens (basketball) (1933–2011), American basketball player
Jack Stephens (cricketer) (1913–1967), Australian cricketer
Jack Stephens (footballer) (born 1994), English footballer
Jack Stephens (set decorator) (active 1949–1986), Bangladeshi set decorator
Jackson T. Stephens (1923–2005), American businessman
Jack Stephens (The Inbetweeners), minor character in British sitcom Inbetweeners
Jack Stephens (born 1988), English musician, member of Munroe Effect

See also
Jack Stevens (disambiguation)
John Stephens (disambiguation)